Petr Kica (born March 10, 1986) is a Czech professional ice hockey player. He is currently playing with HC Bílí Tygři Liberec of the Czech Extraliga.

Kica made his Czech Extraliga debut playing with HC Plzen during the 2005–06 Czech Extraliga season.

References

External links

1986 births
Living people
Czech ice hockey forwards
HC Bílí Tygři Liberec players
HC Plzeň players
HC Benátky nad Jizerou players
HC Berounští Medvědi players
IHC Písek players